"Bear Hug" is the debut single by British musical duo the 2 Bears. It was released on 29 May 2011 as a digital download in the United Kingdom. The song peaked to number 187 on the UK Singles Chart. The song features on the duo's 2011 Extended Play Bearhug and their album Be Strong.

Rolling Stone named the song the 42nd best song of 2012.

Music video
A music video to accompany the release of "Bear Hug" was uploaded to YouTube on 20 June 2011 at a total length of three minutes and forty-eight seconds. The video was recorded at the same beach house as Armand Van Helden's "My My My" video.

Track listing

Chart performance

Release history

References

2011 songs
2011 debut singles
The 2 Bears songs